Fofonovo is a rural locality (a selo) in Kabansky District, Republic of Buryatia, Russia. The population was 279 as of 2010. There are 5 streets.

Geography 
Fofonovo is located 33 km east of Kabansk (the district's administrative centre) by road. Beregovaya is the nearest rural locality.

References 

Rural localities in Kabansky District